The Royal Belfast Golf Club is located on the southern shores of Belfast Lough at Craigavad in County Down, seven miles from the centre of Belfast. Founded in 1881 the club claims to be the oldest such club in Ireland. The present course was designed by Harry Colt

Origins
The course was founded at lands at Kinnegar, Holywood in 1881 and granted a Royal Charter by the Prince of Wales, later Edward VII, in 1885. In 1892 the club moved to Carnalea and then again to its present location at Craigavad in 1914.

See also
List of golf clubs granted Royal status

References

External links

Golf clubs and courses in Northern Ireland
Sports clubs in County Down
Organisations based in Northern Ireland with royal patronage
1881 establishments in Ireland
Golf clubs and courses designed by Harry Colt
Sports venues completed in 1881
Royal golf clubs